The Alfa Romeo 8C Competizione is a sports car produced by Italian automotive manufacturer Alfa Romeo between 2007 and 2010. It was first presented as a concept car at the 2003 Frankfurt Motor Show and later offered for sale for the 2007 model year. The name refers to the eight-cylinder (cilindro in Italian) engine (8C) and Alfa Romeo's racing pedigree (Competizione, Italian for 'competition'). The company received over 1,400 orders for the 8C after the official announcement that the car would enter production. However, only 500 customers ended up with the 8C Competizione and another 329 with the 8C Spider, bringing the production total to 829 cars.

2003 concept car

The 8C Competizione was first shown to the public at the Frankfurt Motor Show in 2003. Designed by Wolfgang Egger at Centro Stile Alfa Romeo, the lines of the twin seater are meant to echo the styling of Alfa Romeo automobiles of the 1950s and 1960s, and the "Competizione" name is a reference to the 1948 6C 2500 Competizione, which competed in the 1949 and 1950 Mille Miglia race and secured third position both times. It was in the latter of these two races that the car was driven by Juan-Manuel Fangio and Augusto Zanardi. It won the 1950 Targa Florio. A 3.0-litre prototype was built but not produced. These 6C 2500 models were among the last vehicles with links to the pre-war cars. The concept was purely meant to be a styling exercise with no drive train.

2007 production version

During the Mondial de l'Automobile 2006, Alfa Romeo announced the production of the 8C Competizione (500 units). The production version is very similar to the concept; the biggest difference to the exterior being the rear-hinged hood. Other minor changes included the front lights, which used Xenon lamps, a standard wiper system, a mesh side vent, and the wheels, which had a design that mimicked the cloverleaf logo. The car came standard in Alfa Red or Black colours. Pearl Yellow and the Special Competition Red were also available as an option. Paint-to-sample colors were also available for an additional charge, and so, the cars were produced in a wide range of colours, such as white, with a Maserati range (Fuji White, Blue Avio, Blue Oceano, Grigio Nuvolari) and a Ferrari range (Blue Pozzi, Vinaccia {Aubergine}). The bodyshell is made of carbon fibre, produced by ATR Group.

The carbon fibre body is fitted to a steel chassis, made by Italian company ITCA Produzione. Final assembly took place at the Maserati factory in Modena.

An 8C Competizione was featured on the main sculpture at the 2010 Goodwood Festival of Speed. One of the two remaining Alfa Romeo P2s was also part of the display.

Powertrain

The car uses a unique platform that shares several components with the Maserati GranTurismo. The powertrain features a Ferrari/Maserati derived cross-plane, wet sump lubricated  90° V8 engine assembled by Ferrari.
The V8 engine has variable timing, intake valves and a compression ratio of 11.3:1.

The six–speed transaxle gearbox has computerized gear selection by means of paddles on the steering column and may be used in Manual-Normal; Manual-Sport; Automatic-Normal; Automatic-Sport and Wet modes. The gearbox can shift gears in 175 milliseconds when the Sport mode is selected. The car also features a limited slip differential.

Performance
The 8C Competizione is fitted with specially developed 20-inch tyres: 245/35 at the front and 285/35 at the rear, wrapped around perforated wheels crafted from fluid moulded aluminium. The official top speed is officially quoted to be  but it might be higher, with estimations that it could be around  according to the Road & Track magazine.

8C Spider

2005 Spider concept
At the 2005 Pebble Beach Concours d'Elegance, Alfa Romeo unveiled the 8C Spider, a roadster version of the Competizione coupé concept presented in 2003. The Spider concept was built by Carrozzeria Marazzi. Production of the 8C Spider was confirmed by Sergio Marchionne on September 25, 2007. It was announced that the Spider would be built in a limited production run of 500 units and would cost around US$227,000 (€165,000), considerably more than the coupé version.

2008 production version

The production version was unveiled at the 2008 Geneva Motor Show. Production of the 8C Spider began in 2009, in Modena, with Maserati in charge of manufacturing the cars as with the coupé. While 500 cars were originally to be produced, due to the impact of the Recession, only 329 Spiders in total were produced, each priced at €199,000 (£174,000) excluding taxes. 35 of 329 Spiders were destined for the United States. In the United States the 8C Spider had a base price of US$299,000. In the October 2011 issue of Evo (magazine) the 8C Spider won the title of the 'Best Sounding Car'.

The brakes on the Spider are Brembo carbon-ceramic units. The Spider has a two-layer electrically operated fabric roof. The windshield frame is made of carbon fibre to try to maintain a 50/50 weight distribution.

Coachbuilt variants

The 8C spawned several bespoke versions from renowned coachbuilders Carrozzeria Touring and Zagato.

Zagato TZ3 Corsa

The Alfa Romeo TZ3 Corsa is the track version of the TZ3 (hence the name TZ3 Corsa, Corsa meaning race in Italian) built to celebrate 100 years (a century) of Alfa Romeo in racing. The Corsa is a one-off car that was first presented at, and won, the 2010 Concorso d'Eleganza Villa d'Este in Italy. This unique car, based on the Alfa Romeo 8C Competizione, was made for German collector Martin Kapp and is not intended for sale or for competitions.

The car weighs  due to its carbon fibre chassis and hand beaten aluminium body.

The chassis is a carbon-fibre monocoque with some tubular elements. The suspension setup, front, and rear, are double wishbones, with pushrod actuated coil springs. The dampers installed are provided by Öhlins.

The similarly-named Alfa Romeo TZ3 Stradale is not based on the 8C, as it was made after production of the 8C had ended, instead of being based on the Dodge Viper ACR.

Alfa Romeo Disco Volante by Touring

The Alfa Romeo Disco Volante by Touring is a two-seater coupé, built by Carrozzeria Touring in 2013. It is based on the Alfa Romeo 8C Competizione. The model name is derived from the Disco Volante of the 1950s. The Disco Volante is rear-wheel-drive with a six-speed automated manual transmission. The transmission is a transaxle with a limited-slip differential, while the suspension is independent quadrilateral and made of aluminium.

Spyder 
A Spyder version of Disco Volante was presented at the Geneva Motor Show in March 2016. A limited series of only seven cars were manufactured. This is based on Alfa Romeo 8C Spider chassis.

Production numbers, markets and notable owners

The 8C Competizione was built in a limited production run of 500 units, and Alfa Romeo originally earmarked the entire production among several specified markets (see table). The entire production of 500 cars quickly sold out. The 8C marked Alfa Romeo's return to the American market in 2008, after withdrawing in 1995. The first 8C was delivered to an Italian customer in October 2007. The first American-market 8C was seen in November 2008, wearing "001 USA" registration plates. The car was purchased by film director and stock exchange magnate James Glickenhaus, also known for being the owner of the bespoke Ferrari Enzo-based P4/5. The 8C's production run was completed by the end of 2008. The last Alfa Romeo 8C Competizione was delivered to the United States to an Italian-American car collector from the Boston area. The late Fiat CEO Sergio Marchionne owned both an 8C Competizione and an 8C Spider. Fiat President and owner John Elkann also owns an 8C Competizione in a special livery called Blu Oceano, which is part of the Maserati color range. New York Mets player Yoenis Céspedes drove a cherry red 8C Competizione to training camp in Florida in February 2016.

References

External links

Alfa Romeo 8C Competizione
Alfa Romeo 8C Spider

8C Competizione
Sports cars
Coupés
Flagship vehicles
Cars introduced in 2007
2010s cars
Front mid-engine, rear-wheel-drive vehicles